Carex arkansana is a tussock-forming species of perennial sedge in the family Cyperaceae. It is native to central parts of the United States.

The sedge has no obvious rhizomes. The leaf blade is usually  in width.

The species was first described by the botanist Liberty Hyde Bailey in 1896 as a part of the Botanical Gazette. It has one synonym; Carex rosea var. arkansana also described by Bailey.

The plant grows in temperate biomes in the central United States from Illinois in the north to Texas in the south.

See also
List of Carex species

References

arkansana
Plants described in 1896
Taxa named by Liberty Hyde Bailey
Flora of Arkansas
Flora of Texas
Flora of Illinois
Flora of Kansas
Flora of Missouri
Flora of Oklahoma